This is a list of Mexican films released in 2000.

2000

External links

References

2000
Films
Mexican